Lester Andrew F. Alvarez (born September 18, 1988) is a Filipino basketball player and head coach for the Valenzuela XUR Homes Realty Inc. of the Maharlika Pilipinas Basketball League (MPBL). Alvarez played college basketball for the Adamson University Soaring Falcons.

College career
In UAAP Season 73 to 74, Alvarez is the one of the key pieces to the Falcons squad alongside Alex Nuyles, as they led the Falcons back to relevance in the UAAP. In his final season, Alvarez led the Falcons to snap a 13-year losing streak against the Ateneo Blue Eagles to deny them of a step-ladder Final Four.

Professional career
Alvarez was eligible to join the 2012 PBA draft, and he applied for the said draft. There, he was picked 15th overall in the second round by the Barako Bull Energy Cola.

Alvarez is mainly a benchman, in January 2013, Alvarez was traded from Barako Bull to San Mig Super Coffee Mixers. The trade was a part of a 5-team, 10-player trade that also involved Barako Bull, San Mig Coffee, Petron Blaze, Barangay Ginebra San Miguel, and Alaska. Unfortunately, Alvarez was put to the reserve list for the 2013–14 season. Alvarez was again inserted on the active roster after an injury sustained by Ian Sangalang, but he has still to play a minute on the 2014–15 PBA season. Alvarez only played 3 minutes in two seasons with the Star Hotshots.

In 2015, Alvarez was released by the Hotshots, but was signed by Euro Med Laboratories of the Pilipinas Commercial Basketball League.

In June 2016, Alvarez was signed by Thai General Equipment of the Thailand Basketball League.

PBA career statistics

Correct as of October 27, 2013

Season

|-
| align="left" | 2012-13
| align="left" | Barako Bull / San Mig Coffee
| 19 || 7.0 || .324 || .375 || .500 || .8 || .4 || .2 || .0 || 1.8
|-
| align="left" | 2013-14
| align="left" | San Mig Super Coffee
| 1 || 3.0 || .000 || .000 || .000 || .0 || 1.0 || .0 || 0.0 || 0.0
|-
| align="left" | Career
| align="left" | 
| 20 || 6.8 || .324 || .375 || .500 || .8 || .4 || .3 || .0 || 1.8

MPBL career statistics

Season

|-
| align="left" | 2018 Anta Rajah Cup
| align="left" | Batangas City
| 17 || 17 || 21.93 || .376 || .269 || .741 || 2.71 || 3.82 || 1.06 || 0.06 || 9.24

References

External links
 MPBL Profile

1988 births
Living people
Barako Bull Energy players
Point guards
Magnolia Hotshots players
Adamson Soaring Falcons basketball players
Filipino expatriate basketball people in Thailand
Colegio de San Juan de Letran alumni
Filipino men's basketball players
Maharlika Pilipinas Basketball League players
Barako Bull Energy draft picks